Robert "Bobby" Wells (born 15 May 1961) is a British former boxer who won the Super Heavyweight bronze medal at the 1984 Summer Olympics.

Wells turned pro two years later but had limited success.  His career ended with a record of 3-2-0 in 1989, including two professional fights in the then Soviet Union in 1989. He was affiliated with the Kingston Amateur Boxing Club. Wells is the son of former boxer Billy Wells, who competed at the 1968 Summer Olympics.

References
 
 sports-reference

1961 births
Living people
English male boxers
Heavyweight boxers
Boxers at the 1984 Summer Olympics
Olympic boxers of Great Britain
Olympic bronze medallists for Great Britain
Boxers from Greater London
Olympic medalists in boxing
British male boxers
Medalists at the 1984 Summer Olympics